Arthur Carlos Harris, Jr. (January 13, 1947 – October 13, 2007) was an American professional basketball player.

Career
After graduating from Jordan High School, in Watts, Los Angeles, Harris joined Stanford University The 6'4" guard received first-team All-AAWU honors as a sophomore and averaged 20.7 ppg as a senior in 1967–68. He averaged 17.2 points per game in his collegiate career and was later named to the Stanford Athletic Hall of Fame.

Harris was selected by the Seattle SuperSonics in the second round of the 1968 NBA draft and by the Oakland Oaks in the 1969 ABA Draft.
He played four seasons (1968–1972) in the National Basketball Association (NBA), starting with the Seattle SuperSonics. He was named to the NBA All-Rookie Team in 1968 after averaging 12.4 points per game. Harris appeared in only 5 games for the Sonics in the 1969–70 season before being traded to the Phoenix Suns for Dick Snyder. Harris remained in Phoenix for the next three seasons before being waived in January 1972.
During the 1968–69 season, Harris led the NBA in disqualifications with 14.

In 1975 he played for the Belgium Lions in the European Professional Basketball League.

Death
Harris died October 13, 2007, in San Francisco, California.

References

External links
Career statistics

1947 births
2007 deaths
American expatriate basketball people in Belgium
American men's basketball players
Basketball players from California
Jewish American sportspeople
Jewish men's basketball players
Oakland Oaks draft picks
Phoenix Suns players
Seattle SuperSonics draft picks
Seattle SuperSonics players
Shooting guards
Stanford Cardinal men's basketball players
20th-century American Jews
21st-century American Jews